Trevor Daniel Johansen (born March 30, 1957 in Thunder Bay, Ontario) is a retired professional ice hockey player who played 286 games in the National Hockey League. Johansen was drafted with the 12th overall pick in the 1977 NHL Entry Draft by the Toronto Maple Leafs. In addition to the Maple Leafs he also spent time with the Colorado Rockies, and Los Angeles Kings. He is the son of Bill Johansen, who played only one game in the NHL.

Career statistics

Regular season and playoffs

External links 

1957 births
Living people
Canadian ice hockey defencemen
Colorado Rockies (NHL) players
Ice hockey people from Ontario
Sportspeople from Thunder Bay
Los Angeles Kings players
National Hockey League first-round draft picks
New Brunswick Hawks players
Springfield Indians players
Toronto Maple Leafs draft picks
Toronto Maple Leafs players
Toronto Marlboros players